Skwala americana, commonly known as the American springfly, is a species of springfly in the family Perlodidae. It is found in North America.

References

Further reading

 
 
 
 
 

Perlodidae